This is the complete list of (physical and digital) number-one singles sold in Finland in 2010 according to the Official Finnish Charts. The list on the left side of the box (Suomen virallinen singlelista, "Official Finnish Singles Chart") represents both physical and digital track sales and the one on the right side (Suomen virallinen latauslista, "Official Finnish Download Chart") represents sales of digital tracks.

Chart history

See also
List of number-one albums of 2010 (Finland)

References

Number-one singles
Finland Singles
2010